Wang Xiangsui (王湘穗, born October 1, 1954) is a professor at Beihang University in Beijing, China and a retired senior Colonel in the People's Liberation Army. He is also a co-author of Unrestricted Warfare, a book which dictates that no country is capable of defeating a superpower, such as the United States, on its own terms.  The book outlines steps that could weaken such superpowers, through unconventional means, including manipulation of banking systems, control of the media and natural resources.

References

1954 births
Living people
People's Liberation Army officers
Chinese military writers
People's Republic of China writers
Academic staff of Beihang University